The 41st Arizona State Legislature, consisting of the Arizona State Senate and the Arizona House of Representatives, was constituted in Phoenix from January 1, 1993, to December 31, 1994, during the second two years of  Fife Symington's first term as governor. Both the Senate and the House membership remained constant at 30 and 60, respectively. The Republicans flipped control in the Senate, gaining five seats and creating a Republican majority at 18–12. The Republicans gained two seats in the house, increasing their majority to 35–25.

Sessions
The Legislature met for two regular sessions at the State Capitol in Phoenix. The first opened on January 11, 1993, and adjourned on April 17, while the Second Regular Session convened on January 10, 1994, and adjourned sine die on April 17.

There were nine Special Sessions, the first of which was convened on February 23, 1993, and adjourned on March 4; the second convened on March 11, 1993, and adjourned sine die on March 16; the third convened on June 7, 1993, and adjourned sine die on June 11; the fourth convened on September 2, 1993, and adjourned sine die later that same day; the fifth convened on September 27, 1993, and adjourned sine die September 28; the sixth convened on November 5, 1993, and adjourned sine die on November 11; the seventh convened on December 17, 1993, and adjourned sine die later that same day; the eighth convened on March 28, 1994, and adjourned sine die on March 30; and the ninth and final special session convened on June 15, 1994, and adjourned sine die on June 17.

State Senate

Members

The asterisk (*) denotes members of the previous Legislature who continued in office as members of this Legislature.

House of Representatives

Members 
The asterisk (*) denotes members of the previous Legislature who continued in office as members of this Legislature.

† Hull resigned on October 4, 1993, and was replaced by Wong on October 14, 1993

†† Wessel resigned on April 12, 1993, and was replaced by Eberhart on April 20, 1993

References

Arizona legislative sessions
1993 in Arizona
1994 in Arizona
1993 U.S. legislative sessions
1994 U.S. legislative sessions